The 1984 NBA playoffs was the postseason tournament of the National Basketball Association's 1983–84 season. The tournament concluded with the Eastern Conference champion Boston Celtics defeating the Western Conference champion Los Angeles Lakers 4 games to 3 in the NBA Finals. Larry Bird was named NBA Finals MVP.

This was the first postseason allowing 16 teams to qualify, a format still in use.
The first round format was also changed from best-of-3 to best-of 5.

It was the first NBA Finals meeting between the Celtics and Lakers since 1969; they met 7 times in the Finals from 1959 to 1969, with Boston coming out on top each year. Going into the 1984 playoffs, the Lakers had already won 2 titles in the 1980s and the Celtics 1, making the revival of the Celtics–Lakers rivalry arguably inevitable and certainly highly anticipated.

Two teams made their playoff debuts and won their first playoff series: the Utah Jazz (who joined the NBA for the 1974–75 season as the New Orleans Jazz) and Dallas Mavericks, a 1980 expansion team. The Jazz did not miss the playoffs again until 2004.

The Detroit Pistons made the playoffs for the first time since 1977, starting a string of nine consecutive appearances that included five straight Conference Finals appearances (1987-1991), three consecutive NBA Finals appearances (1988, 1989, and 1990) and two NBA Championships. They did not miss the playoffs again until 1993.

The New Jersey Nets won a playoff series for the first time in their NBA history, upsetting the defending champion Philadelphia 76ers in 5. This was also the only time the road team won every game in a five-game playoff series. The Nets would not win a playoff series again until 2002.

This was the final postseason appearance for the Kansas City Kings, as the team moved to Sacramento, California two seasons later. Kemper Arena hosted its final NBA playoff game.

The Kingdome also hosted its final NBA playoff game, as the Seattle SuperSonics moved back full-time to the Seattle Center Coliseum two years later. However, the Kingdome continued to host Sonics regular season games on occasion until .

The 1984 playoffs also involved two of the hottest games in NBA history. Game 5 of the First Round between the Knicks and Pistons was played at Joe Louis Arena, as the Pontiac Silverdome was unavailable, with temperatures reaching as high as 120°. Game 5 of the NBA Finals between the Celtics and Lakers at Boston Garden reached temperatures as high as 100°, as the Garden lacked air-conditioning, coupled with the sweltering outdoors conditions in Boston.

Bracket

First round

Eastern Conference first round

(1) Boston Celtics vs. (8) Washington Bullets

 Robert Parish hits the game-tying jumper with 21 seconds left to force OT.

This was the third playoff meeting between these two teams, with each team winning one series apiece.

(2) Milwaukee Bucks vs. (7) Atlanta Hawks

This was the first playoff meeting between the Hawks and the Bucks.

(3) Philadelphia 76ers vs. (6) New Jersey Nets

This was the second playoff meeting between these two teams, with the 76ers winning the first meeting.

(4) Detroit Pistons vs. (5) New York Knicks

 Bernard King/Isiah Thomas Duel. King put up 44 points while having the flu and both middle fingers dislocated, while Thomas scored 16 points in the last 93 seconds of regulation to force OT.

This was the first playoff meeting between the Pistons and the Knicks.

Western Conference first round

(1) Los Angeles Lakers vs. (8) Kansas City Kings

This was the seventh playoff meeting between these two teams, with the Lakers winning five of the first six meetings. All previous series took place while the Lakers franchise were in Minneapolis and the Royals/Kings franchise in Rochester.

(2) Utah Jazz vs. (7) Denver Nuggets

This was the first playoff meeting between the Nuggets and the Jazz.

(3) Portland Trail Blazers vs. (6) Phoenix Suns

This was the second playoff meeting between these two teams, with the Suns winning the first meeting.

(4) Dallas Mavericks vs. (5) Seattle SuperSonics

 Gus Williams banks in the game-winning 3 at the buzzer.

 Game 5 was not played at Reunion Arena because it was booked for the World Championship Tennis event.

This was the first playoff meeting between the Mavericks and the SuperSonics.

Conference semifinals

Eastern Conference semifinals

(1) Boston Celtics vs. (5) New York Knicks

This was the 11th playoff meeting between these two teams, with each team winning five series apiece.

(2) Milwaukee Bucks vs. (6) New Jersey Nets

This was the first playoff meeting between the Bucks and the Nets.

Western Conference semifinals

(1) Los Angeles Lakers vs. (4) Dallas Mavericks

 Pat Cummings hits the game-tying layup with 31 seconds left before Derek Harper made a mistake by dribbling out the clock thinking Dallas was ahead by one, when the score was actually tied.

This was the first playoff meeting between the Mavericks and the Lakers.

(2) Utah Jazz vs. (6) Phoenix Suns

 Walter Davis hits the game-tying 3 pointer with 3 seconds left to force OT.

This was the first playoff meeting between the Suns and the Jazz.

Conference finals

Eastern Conference finals

(1) Boston Celtics vs. (2) Milwaukee Bucks

 Bob Lanier's final NBA game.

This was the third playoff meeting between these two teams, with each team winning one series apiece.

Western Conference finals

(1) Los Angeles Lakers vs. (6) Phoenix Suns

 Magic Johnson's 24 assists sets an NBA playoff record for assists in a game.

 Kareem Abdul-Jabbar hits the game-tying sky-hook with 22 seconds left to force OT.

 Paul Westphal's final NBA game.

This was the fourth playoff meeting between these two teams, with the Lakers winning the first three meetings.

NBA Finals: (E1) Boston Celtics vs. (W1) Los Angeles Lakers

 Gerald Henderson stole a James Worthy pass and made a layup to tie the game with 13 seconds left and eventually force OT; Scott Wedman hits the clutch shot with 14 seconds left in OT.

 Magic Johnson 21 assists sets an NBA Finals record for assists in a game.

 Kevin McHale clotheslined Kurt Rambis; Larry Bird hits the game-tying free throws with 16 seconds left in regulation to force OT, then hits the clutch jumper over Magic Johnson with 16 seconds left in OT; M. L. Carr steals James Worthy's inbound pass and dunks it with 6 seconds left in OT.

 The Heat Game.

This was the eighth playoff meeting between these two teams, with the Celtics winning the first seven meetings.

References

External links
 Basketball-Reference.com's 1984 NBA Playoffs page

National Basketball Association playoffs
Playoffs
Sports in Portland, Oregon

fi:NBA-kausi 1983–1984#Pudotuspelit